

Postage stamps in Nazi Germany

1939

1941

1943

Official stamps

1933

1934

1942

Postage stamps of Germany
Nazi Germany